This was the first edition of the tournament.

Amina Anshba and Anastasia Gasanova won the title, defeating Amandine Hesse and Tatjana Maria in the final, 6–1, 6–7(6–8), [10–8].

Seeds

Draw

Draw

References
Main Draw

TCCB Open - Doubles